Maud Coutereels (born 21 May 1986) is a Belgian football defender currently playing in the Super League for Standard Liège, with whom she has also played the Champions League. She has been a member of the Belgian national team since 2004, and in 2009 she was named Belgian women's footballer of the year.

References

External links
 
 Belgium national profile  at KBVB / URBSFA
 

1986 births
Living people
Belgian women's footballers
Belgium women's international footballers
Expatriate women's footballers in France
Footballers from Namur (province)
Women's association football defenders
Women's association football midfielders
Standard Liège (women) players
BeNe League players
Super League Vrouwenvoetbal players
Belgian expatriate sportspeople in France
Lille OSC (women) players
Division 1 Féminine players
UEFA Women's Euro 2017 players